Grassi is an Italian surname. Notable people with the surname include:

Achille Grassi, Italian Roman Catholic bishop and cardinal
Alberto Grassi, Italian footballer 
Alex de Grassi, American guitarist
Bruno Grassi, Brazilian footballer
Carlo Grassi, Italian cardinal
Carlo Grassi, Italian partisan
Claudio Grassi, Italian tennis player
Davide Grassi, Italian footballer 
Ernesto Grassi, Italian philosopher
Franz Dominic Grassi, German merchant with Italian descent
Giacomo di Grassi, Italian fencing master
Giorgio Grassi, Italian architect
Giovanni Antonio Grassi, Jesuit priest and President of Georgetown University
Giovanni Battista Grassi, Italian physician and zoologist
Giuseppe Grassi, Italian politician, member of the Italian Liberal Party
Giuseppe Grassi, Italian cyclist
Giuseppina Grassi, Mexican professional road cyclist
Gregorio Grassi, Italian Franciscan friar and bishop
Josef Grassi, Austrian portrait and history painter
Libero Grassi, Italian clothing manufacturer, killed by the Mafia
Lucas di Grassi, Brazilian race-car driver
Luigi Grassi, Italian footballer
Marco Grassi, Swiss footballer
Mitch Grassi, Member of the a cappella group Pentatonix (also a sassy little queen)
Nicolò Grassi, also known as Nicola Grassi, Italian painter, active in a late-Baroque or Rococo style
Orazio Grassi, Italian Jesuit astronomer and mathematician
Paolo Grassi, Italian theatrical impresario
Raymond Grassi, Canadian former ice sledge hockey player
Tullio Grassi, Swiss footballer

See also
De Grassi (disambiguation)
De Grassi Street, a street in Toronto, Ontario, Canada
Di Grassi
Grassi Museum, a building complex in Leipzig, Germany, home to three museums: the Ethnography Museum, Musical Instruments Museum, and Applied Arts Museum
Mount Lawrence Grassi, a mountain located immediately south of the town of Canmore, in Alberta's Canadian Rockies
Palazzo Grassi, the former estate of the Grassi family located on the Grand Canal (Venice)

Italian-language surnames